Graphic is an unincorporated community in Crawford County, Arkansas, in the United States.

Graphic was founded in the 1880s.

References

Unincorporated communities in Crawford County, Arkansas
Unincorporated communities in Arkansas